Hauling is a 2010 Brazilian documentary film directed by Sean Walsh about poor families who work as recyclers in São Paulo.

The film premiered in the US at the San Francisco Green Film Festival in March 2011.

Synopsis
The recycling underworld of São Paulo, Brazil is the background to this documentary centering on Claudinês, father to 27 children. In his green VW bus, he visits the Santa Efigênia neighborhood of São Paulo to recycle plastic, cardboard, and computers and other electronic equipment. He and his family represent the lower class of people who are discriminated against by other strata of society.

References

External links
 
 

2010 documentary films
2010 films
Brazilian documentary films
Documentary films about poverty
Films shot in São Paulo
Recycling
Poverty in Brazil
2010s Portuguese-language films